Shivraj Vishwanath Patil (born 12 October 1935) is an Indian politician who was the Minister of Home Affairs of India, from 2004 to 2008 and 10th Speaker of the Lok Sabha from 1991 to 1996. He was Governor of the state of Punjab and Administrator of the Union Territory of Chandigarh from 2010 to 2015. Previously, he served in the Indira Gandhi and Rajiv Gandhi cabinets as Minister of Defence during the 1980s.

Patil resigned from the post of Home Minister on 30 November 2008, following widespread criticism raised after terrorist attacks on Mumbai, and took moral responsibility for the security lapse that led to the attacks.

Early life
Patil was born on 12 October 1935 in the village of Chakur in the Latur district (Marathwada region) of the then princely state of Hyderabad, now Maharashtra, India. He attended Osmania University, Hyderabad, earning a degree in Science and studied law at Bombay University. During 1967–69, he was involved in local government (Latur Municipality). Keshavrao Sonawane and Manikrao Sonawane helped Shivaraj Patil to get his first break to stand from Latur Constituency.

Patil belongs to the Lingayat community. He married Vijaya Patil in June 1963, and has two children - a son and a daughter - with her. He is also a devout follower of Sathya Sai Baba.

In state politics
From 1973 to 1980, he was legislator of Latur Rural Constituency of the Maharashtra Legislative Assembly for two terms of 1973 to 1978 and 1978 to 1980 during which time he held various positions such as Chairman of Public Undertakings Committee, Deputy Minister (Law & Judiciary, Irrigation, Protocol), Deputy Speaker of the Assembly and Speaker of the Assembly.

In central politics
In 1980, he was elected to the 7th Lok Sabha from Latur constituency. By 1999, he had won seven successive Lok Sabha elections in 1980, 1984, 1989, 1991, 1996, 1998 and 1999. In 2004 Lok Sabha election, he lost to Bharatiya Janata Party candidate Rupatai Patil Nilangekar.

In government

First inducted in the Indira Gandhi-led government in as Minister of State for Defence (1980–82), he was given independent charge of the Commerce Ministry (1982–83), from where he was shifted to Science and Technology, Atomic Energy, Electronics, Space and Ocean Development (1983–84).
During 1983–86, he was vice-president of CSIR India. He also served on various committees including those on Defence, External Affairs, Finance, Salaries and Allowances of members of parliament.

In the Rajiv Gandhi government, he was Minister for Personnel, Defence production and later held independent charge of Civil Aviation and Tourism.

He has also held a number of important positions in the party ever since Sonia Gandhi took over the presidency of the party. He is largely known for introducing the Outstanding Parliamentarian Award, India in 1992. He was the chairman of the manifesto committee of the party during the 1999 Lok Sabha election.

As speaker of the Lok Sabha, he had begun or contributed in initiatives on information dissemination to members of the Parliament (through computerisation and modernisation), construction of Parliament Library Building and broadcast of Lok Sabha proceedings, including live broadcast of Question Hour of both houses of the parliament.

Between 1991 and 1995, he was a member/leader of Indian parliamentary delegations to various international parliamentary conferences.

He became Home Minister in 2004. A former Lok Sabha speaker, Shivraj Patil lost in the 2004 polls from Latur in Maharashtra, but has still landed up the second most important position in the Union Cabinet—that of the Home Minister. He was elected to the Rajya Sabha in July 2004. Widely seen as an ineffective minister, his tenure as home minister was marred by one debacle after another and he faced increasing calls for his resignation, eventually forcing it due to the mishandling in the events leading up to and after the 2008 Mumbai attacks. Not to be forgotten also are the 2006 Malegaon bombings, at a Muslim graveyard.

United States Ambassador David Mulford in an embassy cable described his removal after the Mumbai terrorist attack as inevitable and called him "inept" and "asleep on the watch".

Patil is accused for not sending the Central Reserve Police Force to Nandigram, even after repeated requests by the West Bengal government, to restore law and order in the area and the events resulted in police firing and killing of men and women in Nandigram.

Patil's name was considered a likely candidate in 2007 presidential election. However, after the Left opposed his candidacy, Sonia Gandhi proposed Pratibha Patil, Governor of Rajasthan, as the presidential candidate. Shivraj Patil was later considered a possible candidate for the post of Vice-President of India.

On 30 November 2008, just four days after Bombay blasts, Patil resigned from his position of Home Minister in Union Cabinet taking moral responsibility for the security lapse that led to the November 2008 terrorist attacks in Mumbai.

Post 26/11, Shivraj Patil was made the Punjab Governor and Chandigarh Administrator from 2010 to 2015

Controversies
Shivraj Patil is referred to as Nero of India. He was reported to have been changing clothes for public appearances while the country was under a terror attack. His actions are compared to Nero who played his fiddle while the city burned as Patil focused on changing his clothes while the country was witnessing a terror attack. He is also criticized to have omitted this episode from his autobiography.

References

1935 births
Living people
People from Latur district
Osmania University alumni
India MPs 1980–1984
India MPs 1984–1989
India MPs 1989–1991
India MPs 1991–1996
India MPs 1996–1997
India MPs 1998–1999
India MPs 1999–2004
Speakers of the Lok Sabha
Followers of Sathya Sai Baba
Rajya Sabha members from Maharashtra
Maharashtra MLAs 1972–1978
Maharashtra MLAs 1978–1980
Governors of Punjab, India
Governors of Rajasthan
Ministers of Internal Affairs of India
Speakers of the Maharashtra Legislative Assembly
Lok Sabha members from Maharashtra
Administrators of Chandigarh
People from Marathwada
Civil aviation ministers of India
Commerce and Industry Ministers of India